Avalanche City is the stage name of indie folk musician Dave Baxter from Auckland, New Zealand. He is best known for his 2011 New Zealand No. 1 single "Love, Love, Love" and his 2015 single Inside Out, which also charted at No. 1. In 2011, Dave Baxter was awarded the APRA Silver Scroll and nominated for three New Zealand Music Awards, including Breakthrough Artist of the Year, Song of the Year and Album of the Year.

History

Early life 
Baxter began playing guitar at age nine and during his teens he performed in the bands One Must Fall and The Chase. He studied at Waikato Institute of Technology in Hamilton, graduating in 2005 with a Bachelor of Media Arts (Commercial Music).

2011–2014 Our New Life Above the Ground 
In late 2009 Baxter left his job as a music writer and began recording bands in his own studio. He also began to write songs, practice singing, and create his own melodies. After performing his songs for friends, Baxter started Avalanche City and began touring with other musicians. He eventually decided to record the album Our New Life Above the Ground at Kourawhero Hall and offered it as a free download from Avalanche City's official website. Initial response to the album was extremely positive and the song "Love, Love, Love" was picked up by the local New Zealand TV station TV2 TV2 for their station promos. After this point the song placed on the New Zealand singles chart.

The album Our New Life Above the Ground was then re-released and sold well, placing number 4 on the official national albums chart and achieving gold status.

2015–Present We are for the Wild Places 
After 4 years since the release of the Baxter's record breaking debut single Love Love Love, he released his highly anticipated new album, We are for the Wild Places in July 2015.  The album's first single Inside Out was very popular and quickly reached number one on the Official New Zealand Music Chart and was certified Platinum. The album itself was placed no 3 on the Official Top 40 Albums Chart. The second official single from the album, Keep Finding A Way has been released to radio late August.

Discography

Studio albums

Extended plays

Singles

Notes

Music videos

Awards and nominations

References 

APRA Award winners
New Zealand pop music groups